Gideon Adams (February 11, 1755 – June 20, 1834) was a farmer, soldier, and politician in Upper Canada, British North America, British Empire, now Ontario, Canada.

Gideon Adams was born in Connecticut, in 1755 and moved with his family, in 1764, to Arlington, in the New Hampshire Grants. He served, during the American Revolution, as an ensign, in his father's British Loyalist, military company, Adams' Rangers, and later, as a Lieutenant, with Jessup's Loyal Rangers. Following the war, along with other, Loyalist families, Gideon Adams and his family settled in Edwardsburg Township, later moving to South Gower Township, Upper Canada, British North America, British Empire, now North Gower Township, Ontario, Canada in 1818. Adams was named a justice of the peace, in the Eastern District of Ontario in 1796. He also, served, as a major, in the local, Canadian militia, during the War of 1812. Adams represented Grenville, in the 6th Parliament of Upper Canada. Gideon Adams died, in South Gower Township, Upper Canada, in 1834.

References 
 Adams, Robert Train and Douglass Graem Adams.  A Family Record of Dr. Samuel Adams, United Empire Loyalist of Vermont and Upper Canada: The First Five Generations Descending from William Adams of Ipswich (1594-1661) and the Descendants of Dr. Samuel Adams of Arlington, (1730-1810).  R.T. Adams, 1995.
  Johnson, J.K.  Becoming Prominent: Leadership in Upper Canada, 1791-1841.   Kingston, ON, Canada:  McGill-Queen's Press, 1989.

1755 births
1834 deaths
Members of the Legislative Assembly of Upper Canada
People from Leeds and Grenville United Counties
United Empire Loyalists
Loyalist military personnel of the American Revolutionary War
British America army officers
Canadian Militia officers